Chrysina limbata is a species of scarab beetle found in the tropical rainforests of Central America, including Costa Rica, and Mexico. It is in the genus Chrysina, in the subfamily Rutelinae (shining leaf chafers). It is notable for its metallic reflective silver color.

Taxonomy
Chrysina limbata was described in 1894 by zoologists Walter Rothschild and Karl Jordan, initially as Plusiotis limbata - Plusiotis being a synonym of Chrysina. C. limbata is in the superfamily Scarabaeoidea, family Scarabaeidae, subfamily Rutelinae and tribe Rutelini.

Description
C. limbata measures between 25 and 35 mm in length. They have a reflective silver metallic appearance which is achieved through thin film interference within layers of chitin. These layers of the chitin coating are chirped (in layers of differing thicknesses), forming a complex multilayer as each layer decreases in depth; as the thickness changes, so too does the optical path-length. Each chirped layer is tuned to a different wavelength of light. The multilayer found on C. limbata reflects close to 97% of light across the visible wavelength range.

Physicist William E. Vargas believes that the metallic appearance may act like water, appearing only as a bright spot to predators. The rain forest of Costa Rica where C. limbata lives has water suspended from leaves at ground level. Light is refracted in different directions, and it allows metallic beetles to fool predators.

Life history
Like all beetles, scarabs go through a metamorphosis. The life cycle begins when the female lays an egg, which becomes a larva, then a c-shaped pupa, which becomes an adult. The scarab beetles lay their eggs in the ground or in decomposing materials. Larvae feed on plant roots or rotting matter.

Distribution
Chrysina limbata is found in tropical forests of Costa Rica, Central America and Southeast Mexico, especially in the mountain ranges 600 meters above sea level. In 2007 National Geographic Magazine reported that certain varieties of related beetles could be sold for as much as $500, but loss of habitat is a greater threat to Chrysina species than collectors.

References

Rutelinae
Beetles of Central America